Baugé is a former commune in the Maine-et-Loire département in western France. On 1 January 2013, it was merged with the former communes of Montpollin, Pontigné, Saint-Martin-d'Arcé and Le Vieil-Baugé to create the commune of Baugé-en-Anjou. Since then it is a commune déléguée of this commune.

Geography and transport
Baugé is located 40 km east of Angers, 280 km from Paris, and 70 km from Tours.

Bus connections are available at SNCF railway stations in Saumur, Angers, La Flèche and Le Mans.

The closest airport is Angers - Loire Airport, while the larger Tours Loire Valley Airport is also within easy driving distance.

Culture
The annual festival Opéra de Baugé is held near the town.

History
The Battle of Baugé was fought on the bridge here in 1421.

The 14th century Château de Baugé is located in the centre of the town, as is a 16th-century apothecary. The town has several Roman roads.

Baugé is the twin town of Milngavie (near Glasgow) in Scotland and of Kelsterbach in Germany.

Population

Politics
The centre-right candidate Philippe Chalopin defeated the incumbent Guy Delepine in the 2008 mayoral elections.

In the 2007 presidential elections, Baugé supported Nicolas Sarkozy.

See also
Communes of the Maine-et-Loire department

References

External links

 Town website 
 Town tourism page
 Golf de Baugé

Former communes of Maine-et-Loire
Anjou